Izzet Mehmed may refer to:
 Izzet Mehmed Pasha (1723–1784), Ottoman grand vizier (1774–75, 1781–82) and governor of Egypt (1775–78)
 Safranbolulu Izzet Mehmet Pasha (1743–1812), Ottoman grand vizier (1794–98) and governor of Egypt (1791–94)
 Topal Izzet Mehmed Pasha (1792–1855), Ottoman grand vizier (1828–29, 1841–42)

See also
 Izzet
 Izzet Pasha (disambiguation)
 Mehmed